The XM800 Armored Reconnaissance Scout Vehicle, or ARSV, was an experimental scout vehicle developed by the US Army in the 1970s. It was part of a series of armored vehicles being designed by the Army to replace their existing armored personnel carriers, the M113 and M114, with vehicles with greatly improved fighting capabilities. While the MICV-65 program focused on troop carriers, a separate requirement for a scout vehicle led to the XM800. None of the vehicles from the MICV-65 project entered production, although they provided valuable experience that was used in the M2 Bradley.

Two different vehicle designs were designed for the XM800 project, Lockheed's XM800W unconventional articulated 6 × 6 wheeled armored car and FMC's XM800T tracked version. Both models initially featured the same turret with the US-built version of the Hispano-Suiza HS.820 20 mm autocannon, the M139, as the primary weapon, as well as an M60-derived machine gun on a pintle mount. The M139 had been selected for all of the MICV projects. The XM800W was later equipped with a new turret design that kept the M139 cannon, but that had an upper cover that flipped forward to form a gun shield, or rearward to close up.

References
 Jane's World Armoured Fighting Vehicles, 1976.

Reconnaissance vehicles of the United States
Armoured cars
Articulated vehicles